The Zamfara State College Of Education is a state government higher education institution located in Maru, Zamfara State, Nigeria. The current provost is Ibrahim Usman Gusau.

History 
The Zamfara State College Of Education was established in 2000. It was formerly known as 'Teachers’ Training College (TTC)' , was later changed to 'Advanced Teachers’ College ( ATC)' and later on renamed as Zamfara State College Of Education.

Courses 
The institution offers the following courses;

 Chemistry Education
 Biology Education
 Hausa
 Computer Education
 Arabic
 Geography
 English Education
 Mathematics Education

References 

Universities and colleges in Nigeria
2000 establishments in Nigeria